Soy curls are a  soy based meat alternative, made from boiling and dehydrating soybeans, with a texture similar to chicken. Soy curls are prepared by boiling, baking or frying.

History 
Soy curls were invented in Oregon by Butler Foods around the year 2000.

References

Further reading
 

Soy-based foods
Vegan cuisine
Vegetarian cuisine
Meat substitutes